Stone Academy in Solon, Iowa is a public one-room schoolhouse believed to have been built in 1842, located about two miles north of Solon's town center along the west side of Iowa Highway 1, which was the Old Military Road linking Dubuque to Iowa City.  It was formerly known as the Big Grove Township School #1.  It is one of the oldest surviving school buildings in Iowa.

It is a rectangular building built of limestone from the McCune quarry about two miles away.  Its interior walls are plastered.

It is currently a museum, open for tours by appointment only.

References

School buildings completed in 1842
School buildings on the National Register of Historic Places in Iowa
National Register of Historic Places in Johnson County, Iowa
Schools in Johnson County, Iowa
One-room schoolhouses in Iowa
Defunct schools in Iowa